Old Testament Tales is a Canadian children's religious television series which aired on CBC Television in 1957.

Premise
Old Testament stories were portrayed with puppets operated by John Keogh, Linda Keogh, and John Botterel. Clare Slater adapted the stories in what was the first Canadian children's religious television series.

Scheduling
This 15-minute series was broadcast on Thursdays at 5:15 p.m. (Eastern) from 3 January to 28 March 1957.

External links
 
 Haworth, Frank, 1905–1993 at National Library of Canada (composer)

CBC Television original programming
1950s Canadian children's television series
1957 Canadian television series debuts
1957 Canadian television series endings
Black-and-white Canadian television shows
Canadian television shows featuring puppetry